Liverpool Everton was a borough constituency represented in the House of Commons of the Parliament of the United Kingdom. It elected one Member of Parliament (MP) by the first past the post system of election.

History
The constituency was created by the Redistribution of Seats Act 1885 for the 1885 general election, and abolished for the 1950 general election.

Boundaries 
1885–1918: Part of the civil parish of Everton.

1918–1950: The County Borough of Liverpool wards of Everton and Netherfield.

Members of Parliament

Election results

Elections in the 1880s

Elections in the 1890s 

 Caused by Whitley's death.

Elections in the 1900s

Elections in the 1910s 

General Election 1914–15:

Another General Election was required to take place before the end of 1915. The political parties had been making preparations for an election to take place and by the July 1914, the following candidates had been selected; 
Unionist: John Harmood-Banner
Liberal:

Elections in the 1920s

Elections in the 1930s 

General Election 1939–40

Another General Election was required to take place before the end of 1940. The political parties had been making preparations for an election to take place and by the Autumn of 1939, the following candidates had been selected; 
Labour: Bertie Kirby
Conservative:

Elections in the 1940s

References

Everton constituency
Parliamentary constituencies in North West England (historic)
Constituencies of the Parliament of the United Kingdom established in 1885
Constituencies of the Parliament of the United Kingdom disestablished in 1950